The nature park Parco naturale Val Troncea is located in Val Chisone, municipality of Pragelato in the Metropolitan City of Turin. The park was created in 1980 to preserve the natural environment.

Geography
The park is located between 1670 AMSL and 3.280 m AMSL. The highest point is the peak of the mountain Punta Rognosa di Sestriere.  The river Chisone seeps at the very end of the valley, at the foot of Monte Barifreddo and runs through it until it reaches the river Pellice.

Hiking
The nature park has a lot of hiking paths, both linking the different hamlets with each other, or the bottom of the valley with the mountains' peaks.

Landmarks

In the park can still be found old hamlets, representing the valley´s lifestyle and architecture:
 Laval - 1.667 m
 Seytes - 1.919 m
 Troncea - 1.915 m
 Jussaud - 1.786 m
 Alpe Mei
Alpe Mei is located at the end of the valley and is inhabited just in summer. It can be reached within a two-hour walk.
The shepherds produce and sell typical mountain cheese such as ricotta and toma.

Mountain huts
 Hut Troncea
This hut is located in the old hamlet of Troncea and offers a restaurant service.

Two smaller mountain huts can just be used to stay overnight, by asking for the keys to the park headquarters in Pragelato.

 Hut Col del Clapis – 2.756 m
 Hut Col del Beth – 2.785 m, near Bric Ghinivert.

Transportation
The Sapav bus Torino–Sestriere links the hamlet of Traverse.

In August, the park is organizing a shuttle-bus service for tourists, that links the entrance of the valley to the very end (Alpe Mei).

References

External links

The park on Parks.it
Official Website (Italian)

Parks in Piedmont
Val Troncea